The Yingluck Cabinet describes the cabinet selections of Thailand's Prime Minister Yingluck Shinawatra, who served as Prime Minister from 2011 to 2014. Shinawatra was appointed effective 5 August 2011, and she handed in her cabinet list for endorsement on 9 August 2011. Yingluck and her cabinet were sworn in at Siriraj Hospital where King Bhumibol Adulyadej resided, on 10 August 2011.

She would go on to reorganize the cabinet multiple times. Occasionally either the members of the cabinet or the occasion of the swearing was notable in some way.

Cabinet Yingluck I
Composition of the Council of Ministers before 18 January 2012:

Cabinet Yingluck II
On 18 January 2012, Yingluck reshuffled her cabinet, assigning six cabinet members to new posts, naming ten new ministers and deputies and dismissing nine members of the government. The regrouping was assessed as a step to increase loyalty to the head of government and a reaction to discontent with the government's management of the flood disaster. Especially noted was the choice of Nalinee Taveesin (Minister in the PM's Office), who is on a U.S. blacklist for alleged business links to Zimbabwean President Robert Mugabe, and Nattawut Saikua (Deputy Minister of Agriculture), the first leader of the United Front for Democracy Against Dictatorship (UDD, or "Red Shirts") in the government. Yingluck's first cabinet had not incorporated any "Red Shirts" activists.

Composition after the reshuffle on 18 January 2012:

Cabinet Yingluck III

The cabinet was again reshuffled on 27 October 2012. The new Ministers were sworn in by King Bhumibol Adulyadej at Siriraj Hospital where he resides. It was reportedly the first time that the King did not address the Council of Ministers in swearing in them.

Cabinet Yingluck IV
After another reshuffle, Yingluck's fifth cabinet was announced on 30 June 2013.

References

 
2010s in Thailand
Cabinets of Thailand
2011 establishments in Thailand
2014 disestablishments in Thailand
Cabinets established in 2011
Cabinets disestablished in 2014